The 2016 European Pairs Speedway Championship was the 13th edition of the European Pairs Speedway Championship. The final was held in Riga, Latvia on 13 August. 

The title was won by Italy for the first time.

Final

See also 
 2016 Speedway European Championship

References 

2016
European Championship Pairs
Speedway European Championship